Cremeno (Valassinese ) is a comune (municipality) in the Province of Lecco in the Italian region Lombardy, located about  northeast of Milan and about  northeast of Lecco.

Cremeno borders the following municipalities: Ballabio, Barzio, Cassina Valsassina, Morterone, Pasturo.

References

External links
 Official website

Cities and towns in Lombardy
Valsassina